Yeh Ishq Nahin Aasaan is a 1984 Indian Bollywood film directed by Tinnu Anand. It stars Rishi Kapoor, Padmini Kolhapure in pivotal roles.

Cast
 Rishi Kapoor as Salim Ahmed Salim
 Padmini Kolhapure as Salma Mirza
 Deepti Naval as Sahira
 Yogeeta Bali as Phoolrani
 Om Prakash as Nawab
 Iftekhar as Akhtar Mirza
 Asrani as Jamal

Plot
Architect and Poet Salim Ahmed Salim lives in Nizamuddin along with his widowed mother. He re-locates to Lucknow where he is employed with Shirazi & Company. This is where he meets his attractive neighbor, Salma Khan, and both fall in love much to the chagrin of her widower dad, Hamid, who had promised her mother that he will get her married to a wealthy man named Anwar. He instructs her not to leave the house, and when she persists, he sells the house and decides to re-locate to Lahore, Pakistan. Salim attempts to stop them but Hamid assaults him and leaves him senseless. Salim does recover but takes to alcohol and a courtesan named Phoolrani in a big way. His mother intervenes, and compels him to marry their new neighbor's daughter, Sahira, which he reluctantly does. Now trapped in a marriage with a woman he does not love, Salim continues to frequent Phoolrani's brothel, with hopes of being re-united with his estranged sweetheart - only to find that the seemingly demure Sahira will not let go of him that easily.

Songs
Lyrics: Anand Bakshi

External links

1980s Hindi-language films
1984 films
Films scored by Laxmikant–Pyarelal